Chakrayagudem is a village in Eluru district of the Indian state of Andhra Pradesh. It is located in Pedavegi mandal of Eluru revenue division.

Demographics 

 census of India, Chakrayagudem had a population of 1,390. The total population constitute, 689 males and 701 females —a sex ratio of 983 females per 1000 males. 140 children are in the age group of 0–6 years, with child sex ratio of 1090 girls per 1000 boys. The average literacy rate stands at 74.16% with 927 literates.

References

Villages in Eluru district